The Milwaukee Rampage are a former defunct professional American soccer team, that was located in Milwaukee, Wisconsin, which played in the A-League.

History
Founded in 1993 by Milwaukee area businessmen Dan Doucette and Jim Hock, the Rampage played its first game on June 24, 1993, against Siarka Tarnobrzeg. Head coach Boro Sucevic fielded a team which included Tony Sanneh, Brian McBride, Kris Kelderman, Joey Kirk and Steve Provan. The Rampage played another six exhibition games that summer before playing in its first full season a year later. The team entered the 1994 United States Interregional Soccer League where it fell to the Minnesota Thunder in the Midwest Division final. This set up a rivalry between the two teams which continued until the Rampage's departure in 2002. In 1995, the USISL split into an upper and lower league. The Rampage joined the higher, professional league. That year, Milwaukee again fell to the Thunder in the Midwest Division final.  In 1996, the USISL added a third league, the 1996 USISL Select League. In 1996, the Select League, along with the competing A-League, both received Division 2 status from FIFA. This led to a merger between the two leagues to form the 1997 A-League under the umbrella of the USISL.  Milwaukee joined this combined league.  Head Coach Bob Gansler led the team to Milwaukee's first professional sports championship since the 1971 Milwaukee Bucks.  The Rampage defeated the Carolina Dynamo in a shootout.  The team won the championship once more in 2002 under Head Coach Boro Sucevic before the franchise folded later that year.  The Milwaukee Rampage still exists as a professional soccer club and non-profit in Milwaukee.

General managers
 Pat Clemens – 1994
 Jim Harwood – 1994–2002

Coaches
 Boro Sucevic (1993–1994, 2000–2002)
 Carlos Cordoba (1995, 1999)
 Bob Gansler (1996–1998)

Year-by-year

References

Sports in Milwaukee
Defunct soccer clubs in Wisconsin
USISL teams
A-League (1995–2004) teams
1993 establishments in Wisconsin
2002 disestablishments in Wisconsin
Soccer clubs in Wisconsin
Association football clubs established in 1993